James Richard Beaumont is a fictional character that appeared in the later seasons of the popular American television series Dallas, played by Sasha Mitchell.

Background
James Beaumont was J.R. Ewing's son from his affair with Vanessa Beaumont in Vienna; he was born in 1967. James was raised in Europe with his mother and her husband who he believed to be his father until his mother told him that his true father was Texas oil baron J.R. Ewing.

Storylines
James came to Dallas to seek out the father he never knew he had. James shocked everyone when he announced that he was J.R.'s son at a public family dinner with all of the Ewings present. J.R. embraced James as his son but James proved to be as manipulative as J.R. himself. James resented his father's interference in his life from controlling James' business dealings and to attempting to break up James' relationship with Michelle Stevens. Seeking revenge on J.R., James conspired with J.R.'s wife, Cally and blocked J.R.'s release from a sanitarium.

James eventually married Michelle, but he later learned that his first marriage to Debra Lynn was never dissolved. Further, Debra Lynn had his child, James Richard Beaumont, Jr. (nicknamed "Jimmy"). James decided to stay married to Debra Lynn and annulled his marriage to Michelle. However, he ended up moving back east with Debra Lynn and Jimmy to escape the control of J.R.

Dallas (2012 TV series)
James is not mentioned in the series. He did not attend J.R.'s funeral and was not mentioned in his will.

Notes

References

External links

Dallas (TV franchise) characters
Television characters introduced in 1989
Fictional businesspeople

ru:Список актёров и персонажей телесериала «Даллас»#Джеймс Бомонт